Laxmi Chand Gupta (1939–2010) was an Indian medical doctor, radiologist and writer, specialized in sports medicine. He was the medical director of Border Security Force and was a recipient of several honors including the SAARC Literary Award and the B. C. Roy Award, the highest Indian award in the medical category. The Government of India awarded him the fourth highest civilian honour of the Padma Shri, in 2010, for his contributions to medical science.

Biography 
Born on 10 July 1939 in Gwalior in the largest Indian state of Madhya Pradesh, Gupta graduated in medicine from Gajara Raja Medical College of Jiwaji University in 1966 and continued his studies to secure post graduate degrees (MD) in Radiology in 1968 and Social and Preventive Medicine in 1972. He joined the Border Security Force (BSF) in 1966 and worked there till his superannuation in 1997 as the director of medicine, holding the rank of an Inspector General; in between he also worked in Ahvaz, Iran from 1975 to 1980 as a radiologist.

Gupta was known as a specialist in sports medicine and was a member of the Indian Association of Sports Medicine (IASM). He was reported to have been a prolific writer with over 100 medical books to his credit and was mentioned as a world record holder for writing the most number of medical books in 2005 and 2009. Manual of First Aid: Management of General Injuries, Sports Injuries and Common Ailments, Miraculous Effects of Acupressure, Manual of Medical Emergencies, and How to Live with Hypertension and Heart Attack are some of his notable books. He also published several medical papers and served as a member of the advisory boards of Indian Medical Gazette and Current Medical Practice journal.

Gupta, a Fellow of the Academy of Medical Sciences (2006) and the holder of the degree of Doctor of Science (1996), was awarded the B. C. Roy Award, the highest Indian award in the medical category by the Indian Council of Medical Research in 1988. He was also a recipient of awards such as The President's Police Medal (1993), SSF Award of the Spiritual Science Research Foundation (1993), Lifetime Achievement Award of the Madhya Pradesh chapter of the Indian Medical Association (2002) and the SAARC Literary Award (2002). He was selected for the civilian honor of the Padma Bhushan by the Government of India in January 2010. A few months later, he died on 26 May 2010, at the age of 70.

Selected bibliography

See also 
 Sports medicine

References 

Recipients of the Padma Shri in medicine
Dr. B. C. Roy Award winners
1939 births
2010 deaths
People from Gwalior
Medical doctors from Madhya Pradesh
Indian medical writers
Indian sports physicians
World record holders
Indian radiologists
Jiwaji University alumni